The multispine giant stingray, Dasyatis multispinosa is a species of stingray in the family Dasyatidae. Some authors regard this species as the same as the pitted stingray (D. matsubarai).

References

Dasyatis
Fish described in 1959
Taxobox binomials not recognized by IUCN